The 1966 UCI Track Cycling World Championships were the World Championship for track cycling. They took place in Frankfurt, West Germany from 29 August to 4 September 1966. Eleven events were contested, 9 for men (3 for professionals, 6 for amateurs) and 2 for women.

Medal summary

Medal table

See also
 1966 UCI Road World Championships

References

External links
 

Track cycling
UCI Track Cycling World Championships by year
International cycle races hosted by Germany
Sports competitions in Frankfurt
1966 in track cycling
1960s in Frankfurt